Modou Lamin Badjie (born 2 January 1997) is a Gambian football player. He is under contract with the Italian club Atalanta, but is not registered to play for them for the 2019–20 season.

Club career
He made his Serie C debut for Modena on 27 August 2017 in a game against Sambenedettese.

References

External links
 

1997 births
Living people
Sportspeople from Banjul
Gambian footballers
Association football midfielders
Atalanta B.C. players
Modena F.C. players
U.S. Catanzaro 1929 players
Rimini F.C. 1912 players
Serie C players
Gambian expatriate footballers
Gambian expatriate sportspeople in Italy
Expatriate footballers in Italy